Veronika Kapshay and Ágnes Szatmári were the defending champions, but Szatmári chose not to participate. Kapshay partnered up with Julia Cohen but lost in the first round to Tatia Mikadze and Sofia Shapatava.
Elena Bogdan and Mihaela Buzărnescu won the title, defeating Ekaterine Gorgodze and Anastasia Grymalska, 1–6, 6–1, [10–3] in the final.

Seeds

Draw

Draw

References
 Doubles Draw

Telavi Open - Doubles
2011 in Georgian sport
Telavi Open